Hindsight is an acoustically-oriented studio compilation album by British progressive rock band Anathema consisting of re-recorded versions of some of the band's classic songs with the addition of one new song; "Unchained (Tales of the Unexpected)". The title for the album was originally intended to be Temporary Peace.

This album also features cello playing of Dave Wesling from the Royal Liverpool Philharmonic Orchestra. A close friend of the band, Dave previously toured with the band in 2004 and is featured on the DVD A Moment in Time. The record was arranged, recorded, performed and produced solely by the band. Kscope label launched a Hindsight mini-site, available in three languages: English, Italian and French, from where the song "Fragile Dreams" can be downloaded for free in MP3 format if signing to a mailing list. The mini-site also contains streaming previews of "Inner Silence", "Are You There?" and "Angelica".

Track listing
"Fragile Dreams" - 5:30 (from album Alternative 4)
"Leave No Trace" - 4:52 (from album A Fine Day to Exit)
"Inner Silence" - 3:40 (from album Alternative 4)
"One Last Goodbye" - 6:03 (from album Judgement)
"Are You There?" - 5:18 (from album A Natural Disaster)
"Angelica" - 5:00 (from album Eternity)
"A Natural Disaster" - 6:20 (from album A Natural Disaster)
"Temporary Peace" - 5:10 (from album A Fine Day to Exit)
"Flying" - 6:27 (from album A Natural Disaster)
"Unchained (Tales of the Unexpected)" - 4:18 (previously unreleased)

Charts

References

External links
Anathema's Official Website
Anathema's Official MySpace
Hindsight mini-site at Kscope Music

Anathema (band) albums
2008 compilation albums
Kscope albums